Aryam Abreu Delgado (born 9 July 1978) is a Cuban chess Grandmaster (2008).

Best results: 2nd at Albariño International Open in Cambados, October 2005; 1st at the Villa de Mislata Open in Spain 2005; 4th in the Cuban Championship 2007; 1st-2nd at the Capablanca Memorial Open 2008; 1st at the Villa de Bilbao Rapid 2008.

His best Elo rating was 2502 in 2008.

References

External links

Chess grandmasters
Living people
Cuban chess players
1978 births